The 1995 NCAA Division II Lacrosse Championship was the 11th annual tournament to determine the national champions of NCAA Division II men's college lacrosse in the United States.

The final, and only match of the tournament, was played at Stagg Field at Springfield College in Springfield, Massachusetts. 

Adelphi defeated hosts Springfield in the championship, 12–10, to claim the Panthers' fourth Division II national title.

Bracket

See also
1995 NCAA Division I Men's Lacrosse Championship
1995 NCAA Division I Women's Lacrosse Championship
1995 NCAA Division III Men's Lacrosse Championship

References

NCAA Division II Men's Lacrosse Championship
NCAA Division II Men's Lacrosse Championship
NCAA Division II Men's Lacrosse